Robert Sands (born November 3, 1989) is an American football safety for the Columbus Lions of the National Arena League (NAL). He was drafted by the Cincinnati Bengals in the fifth round of the 2011 NFL Draft. He played college football for the West Virginia Mountaineers.

College career
Sands played college football for the West Virginia Mountaineers. After his junior season, Sands announced that he would forgo his senior season and enter the 2011 NFL Draft.

Professional career

Cincinnati Bengals
Sands was drafted by the Cincinnati Bengals with the 134th overall pick in the 2011 NFL Draft. He agreed to terms on a rookie contract on July 29. On December 4, 2011, Sands made his debut against the Pittsburgh Steelers but did not record any stats. He was placed on injured reserve on August 24, 2012, due to a chest injury. The Bengals released him on June 12, 2013.

Saskatchewan Roughriders
On January 29, 2016, Sands signed with the Saskatchewan Roughriders of the Canadian Football League. On April 19, 2016, Sands was released.

Los Angeles KISS
On May 26, 2016, Sands was assigned to the Los Angeles KISS. On June 14, 2016, Sands was placed on reassignment.

Columbus Lions
On August 30, 2017, Sands signed with the Columbus Lions.

West Virginia Roughriders
On November 13, 2018, Sands signed with the West Virginia Roughriders of the American Arena League.

Arrest
In January 2013, Sands was arrested and charged with assault in the fourth degree in a domestic violence incident against his 8 month pregnant wife.

References

External links
 
 
 
 Cincinnati Bengals bio
 
 West Virginia Mountaineers bio

1989 births
Living people
American football cornerbacks
American football safeties
Cincinnati Bengals players
Edmonton Elks players
Players of American football from Jacksonville, Florida
Miami Carol City Senior High School alumni
West Virginia Mountaineers football players
Los Angeles Kiss players
Columbus Lions players
Players of American football from Miami
Players of Canadian football from Miami
https://www.wcpo.com/sports/football/bengals/bengals-safety-robert-sands-arrested-on-domestic-assault-charges

https://www.cincyjungle.com/2013/1/4/3837648/bengals-safety-robert-sands-accused-of-assaulting-his-wife

https://stripehype.com/2013/01/04/bengals-safety-robert-sands-arrested-for-domestic-violence/

http://www.walb.com/story/20508183/injured-safety-robert-sands-arrested-in-florence-on-friday